Chernoe Znamia (or Chornoe Znamia), known as the  Chernoznamentsy, was a Russian anarchist communist organisation. It emerged in 1903 as a federation of cadres. It took its name, "The Black Banner", from the anarchist black flag.

Composition 
The largest collection of anarchist terrorists in Imperial Russia, Chernoe Znamia attracted its strongest following in the western and southern provinces at the frontier of the Empire, including nearly all anarchists in Białystok. Their ranks included mostly students, factory workers and artisans, though there were also peasants, unemployed labourers, drifters, and self-professed Nietzschean supermen. Ethnically, Jews predominated, and many members were of Ukrainian, Polish and Great Russian nationality. The typical age of the Chernoznamentsy was nineteen or twenty, and some of the most active adherents were as young as fifteen years old.

Tactics and ideology 

With a history marked, in the words of historian Paul Avrich, by "reckless fanaticism and uninterrupted violence", the Chernoznamensty were the first anarchist group with a deliberate policy of terror against the established order. They saw merit in every act of propaganda by the deed, no matter how intemperate and senseless it appeared to the public, as evoking the lust of the underclass for vengeance against their tormentors. Along with the equally fanatical Beznachalie ("Without Authority"), Chernoe Znamia was the most conspicuous anarchist communist organisation in Russia.

See also 
Narodnaya Volya, a similar organisation of an earlier generation

References

Bibliography

External links
Chernoe Znamia at the Daily Bleed's Anarchist Encyclopedia

1903 establishments in the Russian Empire
Anarchist organizations in Russia
Communist organizations in Russia
Defunct anarchist militant groups
Defunct communist militant groups
Jewish anarchism
Organizations established in 1903
Organizations of the Russian Revolution
Organizations with year of disestablishment missing
Political movements
Political organizations based in the Russian Empire
Terrorism in the Russian Empire
Defunct anarchist organizations in Europe